Matthew Heywood Tueller (born 1957) is an American diplomat who formerly served as the United States Ambassador to Iraq. A career United States Foreign Service officer, he served as the United States Ambassador to Kuwait and Yemen as well.

Early life and education 
Tueller was born in Utah. His father, Blaine Carlson Tueller, was Foreign Service officer, and as a result, Tueller grew up in Europe, North Africa, and Latin America, including four years in Tangier, Morocco, where he learned Arabic.

Tueller earned a Bachelor of Arts degree from Brigham Young University and a Master of Public Policy from the Harvard Kennedy School.

Career

Early career 
Matthew Tueller is a career member of the Senior Foreign Service and his other overseas assignments have included Deputy Chief of Mission at Embassy Cairo; Political Minister Counselor at Embassy Baghdad; Deputy Chief of Mission at Embassy Kuwait; Political Counselor at Embassy Riyadh; Chief of the U.S. Office in Aden, Yemen; Deputy Chief of Mission at Embassy Doha; Political Officer at Embassy London; and Political Officer and Consular Officer at Embassy Amman. His Washington assignments have included Deputy Director in the Office of Northern Gulf Affairs and Egypt Desk Officer.

Ambassador to Kuwait
Tueller arrived in Kuwait on September 23, 2011. He was nominated as the U.S. Ambassador to Kuwait by President Barack Obama on May 4, 2011. His nomination was confirmed by the U.S. Senate on June 30, 2011, and he was sworn in by Deputy Secretary of State William J. Burns on September 8.

Ambassador to Yemen
Tueller was the United States Ambassador to Yemen from 2014 to 2019.

He has been involved in negotiations between Yemen's Houthi forces and partners of the Saudi-led coalition during the course of the present civil war. His impartiality has been questioned by both Houthi negotiators and others within the State Department, leading to criticism over the United States' role in the prolonged state of the conflict and the resulting humanitarian crisis.

Ambassador to Iraq
On November 7, 2018, the White House announced the president's intent to nominate Ambassador Matthew H. Tueller to be the next United States Ambassador to Iraq. On May 16, 2019, the United States Senate confirmed the nomination of Tueller to be United States Ambassador to the Republic of Iraq.

Personal life
Tueller is married to DeNeece Gurney and has five children. He is an active member of the Church of Jesus Christ of Latter-day Saints, having served a two-year mission in Spain. He speaks Arabic.

See also 
 List of ambassadors appointed by Donald Trump

References

External links 

 
 
 Matthew H. Tueller congratulates the people of Kuwait
 

|-

|-

1957 births
Living people
Place of birth missing (living people)
Brigham Young University alumni
Harvard Kennedy School alumni
Ambassadors of the United States to Kuwait
Ambassadors of the United States to Yemen
Ambassadors of the United States to Iraq
United States Foreign Service personnel
American Mormon missionaries in Spain
Latter Day Saints from Utah
21st-century American diplomats
American expatriates in Morocco
American expatriates in Egypt